Enos Stanley Kroenke (born July 29, 1947) is an American billionaire businessman.  He is the owner of Kroenke Sports & Entertainment, which is the holding company of Arsenal F.C. of the Premier League and Arsenal W.F.C. of the WSL, the Los Angeles Rams of the NFL, Denver Nuggets of the NBA, Colorado Avalanche of the NHL, Colorado Rapids of Major League Soccer, Colorado Mammoth of the National Lacrosse League, the Los Angeles Gladiators of the Overwatch League, and the Los Angeles Guerrillas of the Call of Duty League.

The Nuggets and Avalanche franchises are held in the name of his wife, Ann Walton Kroenke, to satisfy NFL ownership restrictions that forbid a team owner from having teams in other markets.  Ann is the daughter of Walmart co-founder James "Bud" Walton. Kroenke was estimated to be worth US$10.7 billion by Forbes in 2022.

Kroenke's holding company for sports teams has been controversial. In 2016, he broke contracts by relocating the St. Louis Rams to Los Angeles, spurring legal costs to the entire league. In 2021, Kroenke was involved in an aborted effort to end the traditional European football system by creating a closed European Super League which would have included Arsenal and several other teams.

In the four major U.S. sports, Kroenke's teams have won four championships under his ownership (either partial or full), with the Rams winning two Super Bowls, and the Avalanche winning two Stanley Cups.  He also has an MLS Cup to his credit as owner of the Rapids, and two National Lacrosse League Championships as owner of the Mammoth.

Early life and education

Kroenke grew up in Mora, Missouri, an unincorporated community with a population of approximately two dozen, where his father owned Mora Lumber Company. His first job was sweeping the floor at his father's lumber yard. By age 10 he was keeping the company's books. At Cole Camp (Missouri) High School, he played baseball, basketball and ran track.

Business career

Real estate
Kroenke married Ann Walton, a Walmart heiress, in 1974. He founded the Kroenke Group in 1983, a real estate development firm that has built shopping centers and apartment buildings. He has developed many of his plazas near Walmart stores.

He is also the chairman of THF Realty, an independent real estate development company that specializes in suburban development. He founded this corporation in St. Louis, Missouri, in 1991. In 2016, THF's portfolio was valued at more than $2 billion, including more than 100 projects totaling 20 million square feet, primarily in retail shopping centers.

Other ventures
In 2006, Kroenke, in partnership with the money manager Charles Banks, acquired Screaming Eagle, a winery in Napa Valley. In April 2009, Banks stated he was no longer personally involved with Screaming Eagle.

Kroenke is a major owner of working ranches, owning a total of 848,631 acres. The Land Report magazine ranked him as the United States' ninth-largest landowner in 2015. Among notable purchases is his February 2016 acquisition of the famous Waggoner Ranch in Texas, the largest ranch within one fenceline.

In August 2017, he came under fire for launching a British outdoor sports television channel that will show regular hunting programmes that includes killing elephants, lions, and other vulnerable African species.

Professional sports

Kroenke Sports and Entertainment

Founded in 1999, Kroenke Sports & Entertainment owns Ball Arena in Denver, home of the Nuggets, Avalanche and Mammoth, and co-owns Dick's Sporting Goods Park in Commerce City, home of the Rapids. Both venues were built by his development company. In 2004, Kroenke launched his own competitor to FSN Rocky Mountain (now known as AT&T SportsNet Rocky Mountain), Altitude, a new regional sports network which became the official broadcaster for both of Kroenke's teams on launch. Kroenke also established TicketHorse, a ticket company that provides in-house sales for all of his teams.

Denver Nuggets and Colorado Avalanche

In 2000, Kroenke became full owner of both the National Basketball Association's Denver Nuggets and the National Hockey League's Colorado Avalanche, purchasing the teams from Charlie Lyons's Ascent Entertainment Group.

Colorado Crush

In 2002, Kroenke partnered with Denver Broncos owner Pat Bowlen and former Bronco quarterback John Elway to become part-owner of the Arena Football League's Colorado Crush.

Colorado Mammoth and Colorado Rapids

Kroenke continued to grow his sports empire in 2004 when he purchased the National Lacrosse League's Colorado Mammoth and Major League Soccer's Colorado Rapids from Phil Anschutz.

St. Louis Rams
On April 13, 1995, Stan Kroenke helped Georgia Frontiere move the National Football League's Los Angeles Rams from Anaheim to St. Louis by purchasing a 30% share of the team.

In 2010, Kroenke exercised his right of first refusal to purchase the remaining interest in the Rams from the estate of late owner Georgia Frontiere. On August 25, 2010, he became full owner of the Rams by unanimous consent of the NFL. To gain approval from NFL owners, Kroenke agreed to turn over control of the Denver Nuggets and Colorado Avalanche to his son, Josh, by the end of 2010, and he had to give up his majority stake in both teams in December 2014. The NFL does not allow its owners to hold majority control of major league teams in other NFL markets. On October 7, 2015, the NFL approved transfer of his ownership stake of the Avalanche and Nuggets to his wife, Ann Walton Kroenke.

Stadium issues

In April 2010, as he was trying to gain full ownership of the team, and knowing of an escape clause in the Rams lease at the Edward Jones Dome, Stan Kroenke said: "I'm going to attempt to do everything that I can to keep the Rams in St. Louis."

In February 2013, the Rams and the City of St. Louis went to arbitration over a clause in the Rams' lease that stated the Rams current stadium must be in the top tier of NFL stadiums. The arbitrators agreed with the Rams, giving the Rams the ability to break their original lease and assume a year-to-year lease agreement.

Saying that he was willing to work with Missouri officials and to give the governor a "complete understanding" of the stadium situation, on November 30, 2015, Stan Kroenke met with Missouri Governor Jay Nixon at Rams Park in Earth City, Missouri.

Los Angeles Rams

St. Louis Rams relocation to Los Angeles
On January 5, 2015, it was announced that the Kroenke Group was teaming up with Stockbridge Capital Group to build a 70,000-seat NFL stadium and venue in Inglewood, California, a suburb of Los Angeles, threatening the Rams' future in St. Louis. In response, St. Louis countered with National Car Rental Field, a proposed open-air stadium in the north riverfront in downtown St. Louis with the hope of the Rams staying in St. Louis. At the NFL relocation presentation, Kroenke stated that St. Louis was no longer a viable market for the NFL, and was best served by only two teams. Kroenke also questioned the financial future of the team. NFL commissioner Roger Goodell stated that the St. Louis funding did not meet the criteria set by the NFL. St. Louis officials countered that Kroenke was misrepresenting the city and defended that St. Louis was being misrepresented at the owners' meetings.

The Oakland Raiders and San Diego Chargers had also been unhappy with their old stadiums (Oakland Coliseum in Oakland and Qualcomm Stadium in San Diego, respectively) lacking updated amenities, and had been proposing a stadium in Carson, California (another suburb of Los Angeles) in competition with Kroenke's Inglewood proposal.

On January 4, 2016, all three teams applied for relocation to Los Angeles for the 2016 NFL season. The following day, the Rams and Stan Kroenke released their proposal for relocation. Some of the Rams' conclusions were disputed by the Mayor of St. Louis Francis Slay (in a letter to Roger Goodell), the St. Louis Regional Chamber, and Forbes. However, some said that staying in St. Louis was ultimately a bad deal for the city and the city is better off with them leaving.

On January 12, 2016, the NFL approved the Rams' application to relocate from St. Louis back to Los Angeles with a 30–2 vote and Kroenke was praised by other NFL owners afterwards. In 2017, the Chargers announced that they would move to Los Angeles for the 2017 season, with the intention of initially playing games in Carson, but then moving into Kroenke's Inglewood Stadium, pending completion. The Raiders subsequently announced a move to Las Vegas, Nevada.

On April 12, 2017 it was reported that the City of St. Louis, St. Louis County, and the Regional Convention and Sports Complex Authority filed a 52-page lawsuit against the NFL and all 32 NFL clubs as defendants (including Stan Kroenke) and seeks damages and restitution of profits. On July 12, 2017, the Los Angeles Rams filed three motions seek to: dismiss the case for failure to state a claim, dismiss the case for lack of personal jurisdiction, and appeal to have the case determined through arbitration rather than in front of a St. Louis based jury. The motions in the case will be decided upon by Judge Christopher McGraugh. On April 20, 2020, the Supreme Court denied Kroenke and the NFL's appeal of the lawsuit. On November 24, 2021, after four years of litigation, it was announced that the NFL, Kroenke, and the various St. Louis parties had agreed to a $790 million dollar settlement to end the lawsuit.

Arsenal
Kroenke is the owner of Arsenal Holdings plc which owns association football clubs Arsenal F.C. of the Premier League and Arsenal W.F.C. of the WSL. Arsenal already had a technical link-up with Kroenke's Colorado Rapids when in April 2007 Granada Ventures, a subsidiary of ITV plc, sold its 9.9% stake in Arsenal Holdings plc to Kroenke's KSE UK inc. Kroenke went on to buy further shares in the club, taking his total stake up to 12.19%. The club's board initially expressed skepticism that a bid would be in its best interests, but gradually warmed to him as part of counteracting Alisher Usmanov's rival bid for the club.

By June 2008, the board had prepared to let Kroenke take over, and on September 19, 2008, it was officially announced that Kroenke had joined the board of directors. Kroenke had a beneficial interest in, and controlled voting rights, over 18,594 shares, representing 29.9% of the issued shares. Nearing the maximum 29.99% threshold, beyond which an offer for all remaining shares would be forced to be made.

On April 10, 2011, it was reported that Kroenke was in advanced talks to complete the takeover. The following day, it was announced that he increased his shareholding to 62.89% by purchasing the stakes of Danny Fiszman and Lady Nina Bracewell-Smith, and agreed to make an offer for the rest of the club at £11,750 per share, valuing the club at £731M.

In August 2018, he made an offer that was accepted of around £600m valuing the total shareholding at £1.8bn, to Alisher Usmanov, to bring his ownership of shares beyond 90% and forcing the compulsory purchase of the remaining shares.

In April 2021, Arsenal were announced as a founding member of the European Super League, which would have effectively ended the pyramid system of European football and placed Arsenal in a closed league without prospects for meritocratic relegation and promotion. Arsenal and the five other English clubs involved backed out within two days after a strong backlash. After the aborted attempt to end the European football system, Arsenal fans protested and called for the Kroenke family to sell the club. The Kroenke family released a statement saying they would not sell the club.

Los Angeles Gladiators

In late 2017, Kroenke Sports and Entertainment developed a new esports team franchise named the Los Angeles Gladiators in the newly founded Overwatch League; their inaugural season began on December 6.

Los Angeles Guerrillas
In 2019, Kroenke Sports and Entertainment developed their second esports team. They founded the Los Angeles Guerrillas of the Call of Duty League. They, along with the Los Angeles Gladiators of the Overwatch League, are based out of Hollywood Park next door to where Kroenke's Rams play.

Awards and honors
Two-time Super Bowl Champion with the Rams (XXXIV as co-owner in St. Louis, LVI as full owner in Los Angeles)
Two-time Stanley Cup Champion (as owner of the Avalanche)
2010 MLS Cup Champion (as owner of the Colorado Rapids)
Two-time National Lacrosse League Champion (as owner of the Colorado Mammoth)

Personal life

On a ski trip to Aspen, Colorado, Kroenke met his future wife, Ann Walton, a Walmart heiress. They married in 1974. Already wealthy from real estate, he became even wealthier when he and Ann inherited a stake in Walmart upon the 1995 death of her father, James "Bud" Walton. As of September 2015, that stake was worth $4.8 billion.

He is of German descent and was raised Lutheran.

Kroenke is a somewhat reclusive man who prefers to avoid the spotlight. He is popularly known as "Silent Stan" because he almost never gives interviews to the press. He rarely interferes in his teams' day-to-day operations.

During the 2016 U.S. presidential campaign, he donated $100,000 to the Hillary Victory Fund. He subsequently donated $1 million to Donald Trump's inaugural committee.

In 2022, Kroenke experienced a unique feat with three of his teams winning championships in the same calendar year - the Rams winning the Super Bowl (February), the Mammoth winning the NLL Championship (June), and the Avalanche winning the Stanley Cup (June).

References

External links
 Forbes profile

1947 births
Living people
American billionaires
American company founders
American soccer chairmen and investors
American sports businesspeople
Arena Football League executives
Arsenal F.C. directors and chairmen
Colorado Avalanche owners
Denver Nuggets owners
Colorado Rapids owners
Missouri Republicans
National Basketball Association executives
National Basketball Association owners
National Hockey League executives
National Hockey League owners
People from Columbia, Missouri
Los Angeles Rams owners
Stanley Cup champions
University of Missouri alumni
Walton family
Kroenke Sports & Entertainment
American Protestants
American people of German descent
National Lacrosse League owners
Los Angeles Gladiators